"El último vals" (The Last Waltz) is the first single from the album A las cinco en el Astoria by the Spanish pop/rock group La Oreja de Van Gogh. It is also the first single released after the departure of the former lead singer of the group Amaia Montero and with the new singer Leire Martínez. The song's lyrics are based on Martin Scorsese's 1978 concert film The Last Waltz.

Music video
The music video for the song was filmed in Spain and was premiered in July 2008.

Chart performance

Certifications and sales

See also
List of number-one songs of 2008 (Mexico)

External links
Group's official website with "El último vals" audio.
Lyrics with English translation

References

2008 singles
2008 songs
Sony BMG singles
La Oreja de Van Gogh songs